KEYL (1400 AM) is a radio station broadcasting a Country music format. Licensed to Long Prairie, Minnesota, United States, the station serves the Alexandria, MN area. The station is currently owned by Doug Frauenholtz, through licensee D&K Distributors, Inc. They also air Fox News at 6, 7 & 8 AM, Noon and 5 PM.

References

External links

Country radio stations in the United States
Radio stations in Minnesota
Radio stations established in 1959
1959 establishments in Minnesota